Najma Akhtar also known as Najma (born 18 September 1962) is a British singer of Indian ancestry.  She was born in Chelmsford, England.

She is noted for jazz modification of the traditional Urdu Indian ghazal (love songs and spiritual songs).

She has also appeared as a performer in the songs and videos of other performers, such as jazz and rock saxophonist Stan Harrison. Najma has also worked with Robert Plant and Jimmy Page on the No Quarter DVD.

Discography 

 Qareeb, 1987
 Ghazals, 1988
 Atish, 1990
 Pukar, 1992
 Forbidden Kiss: the Songs of S. D. Burman, 1996
 Vivid, 2002
 Fariyaad: A plea to the creator, 2008
 Rishte, 2009
 Five Rivers, 2020

Notable Collaborations 
 with Jah Wobble on his album Take Me to God
 with Andy Summers on his album The Golden Wire
 with Steve Coleman on his albums Black Science and A Tale of 3 Cities
 with Ken Morioka on his album in Japan titled Question
 with Apache Indian on his hit single titled Arranged Marriage
 with Jimmy Page and Robert Plant (both formerly of Led Zeppelin) on the track "The Battle of Evermore" from their album No Quarter: Jimmy Page and Robert Plant Unledded
 with Jethro Tull on the title track from the album J-Tull Dot Com
 with La Cucina (band) on their album Bloom
 with Sundae Club on their track Harold  and their Stuff  remix. She is also sampled in the song "Flight Four: India" off the album British Summer Time

Notes

External links
[ biography at allmusic.com]
Najma's official web site

English women singers
Living people
1962 births
People from Chelmsford
Musicians from Essex
English people of Indian descent